Llywelyn Siôn (1540 – c. 1616) was a Welsh language poet and bard.

His instructors included Meurig Dafydd and Thomas Llewelyn. Around 1575, he is mentioned under the name Lewelyn John by Sir Edward Mansel in his History of the Norman Conquest of Glamorgan, as a learned and diligent collector of Welsh manuscripts. Following in Meurig Dafydd's footsteps, Siôn became (in 1580) president of the 'Gorsedd' or bardic congress of Glamorgan, presiding He presided at the Glamorgan gorsedd at Tir Iarll in 1580, and was commissioned to collect and publish and traditional lore of the bardic order.

References
Oxford Dictionary of National Biography, Llywelyn Siôn [Llywelyn of Llangewydd] (c.1540–c.1615), Welsh language poet and copyist, by Glanmor Williams.

External links

Welsh-language poets
16th-century Welsh poets
17th-century Welsh poets
1540 births
1610s deaths
16th-century male writers
17th-century male writers